The  is a public transport authority in Hakodate, Japan. The bureau currently operates only trams, although until 2003 it also ran a number of bus routes.

The , a private horsecar operating company, opened Hakodate's first tramway line in 1897. The network was electrified in 1913. Following several changes of ownership, the Hakodate City Government finally took over control of the lines in 1943.

Hakodate City Tram
There were once twelve routes operating on six lines with a total length of 17.9 km. However, declining ridership led to closure of parts of the network in 1978, 1992, and 1993. The current network consists of two routes operating on four lines with a total length of 10.9 km. 

Lines: Officially, there are four lines:
Main Line (本線): Hakodate-Dokku-mae — Jūjigai — Hakodate-Ekimae
Yunokawa Line (湯の川線): Matsukazechō — Yunokawa
Hōrai-Yachigashira Line (宝来・谷地頭線): Jūjigai — Yachigashira
Ōmori Line (大森線): Hakodate-Ekimae — Matsukazechō
Routes: There are two routes in regular service, using the above lines as follows:
■ Route 2 (2系統): Yunokawa — Matsukazechō — Hakodate-Ekimae — Jūjigai — Yachigashira
■ Route 5 (5系統): Yunokawa — Matsukazechō — Hakodate-Ekimae — Jūjigai — Hakodate-Dokku-mae
For most of the day, trams run every ten minutes on each route, or every five minutes on the section between Yunokawa and Jūjigai, which is shared by both routes. After 19.00 the frequency is reduced to one tram every twenty minutes on each route, or every ten minutes on the shared section.

ICAS nimoca Card, a magnetic prepaid card, is accepted for payment of fares.

See also
List of light-rail transit systems
Sapporo City Transportation Bureau

External links 
  Official website
 Network map

Tram transport in Japan
4 ft 6 in gauge railways in Japan
Transport in Hakodate